The  or Igakkan was a major medical educational institution in Edo under the direct patronage of the Shogunate,
 the only one of its kind. Its large medical library is now one of the principal antique documents holdings of the National Archives of Japan.

History
Under the roju Matsudaira Sadanobu, the quality of doctors in Edo was bad, prompting the Shogunate to open a medical school. The Seijukan itself was opened in 1765 by a former doctor of the Shogunate, .

Once the shogunate took control, the school was renamed Igakukan. Initially located in Kanda-Sakumacho, it burnt down in 1806 and moved to Mukō-Yanagiwaramachi, present day Asakusabashi 4-16.

The school collected and copied a vast amount of traditional Chinese medical works and treatises, its studies being largely influenced by the Kaozheng school of thought. It became a powerful key medical institution, the de facto core of all medical research and education in the country. Starting 1849, all books released related to medecine in Japan were to be approved by the Igakukan.

In 1868, with the fall of the shogunate, the Igakukan became a smallpox vaccination/prevention institute.

See also
The Shōheiko School, another Tokugawa-sanctioned school focusing on confucian teachings
Wagakukōdansho, a Tokugawa-sanctioned institute of literature and history
Bansho Shirabesho, an institute devoted to the study of foreign texts

References

Edo period
Society of Japan
Japanese medical researchers
Medical education
History of medicine by country
Shōguns